Elision is the omission of one or more sounds in a word or phrase.

Elision may also refer to:

 Elision (music), a concept in the analysis of 18th- and 19th-century Western music
 ELISION Ensemble, a chamber ensemble specialising in contemporary classical music
 Elision (French), the suppression of a final unstressed vowel
 Copy elision, a compiler optimization technique that eliminates unnecessary copying of objects

See also
 Elisionism, a philosophical standpoint encompassing various social theories
 Ellipsis (disambiguation)
 Elysian (disambiguation)
 Elysium (disambiguation)